Miss South Africa 2017, the 59th edition of the Miss South Africa Pageant was held on Sunday, March 26, 2017 at the Sun City Superbowl. It was simulcast as a live broadcast on M-Net and Mzansi Magic. Twenty six semi-finalists from different provinces were selected from over nine hundred women who entered, but only 12 finalists competed for the crown. Demi Leigh Nel-Peters emerged victorious and was named as Miss SA 2017 at the conclusion of the 2 hour event. Demi-Leigh represented South Africa at Miss Universe 2017 and was crowned as the new Miss Universe. Her 1st princess Adè van Heerden competed at Miss World 2017, finishing in Top 10.

Judges
Six celebrity judges, from the industries of fashion, sport, pageants and entertainment, together with a public vote decided the winner of Miss South Africa 2017.

1. Bridget Masinga 

2. Cameron van den Berg

3. Miss SA 2004, Claudia Henkel 

4. Unathi Msangena

5. Maps Maponyane 

6. Gisele Aymes

7. South African Public Voting

Public Voting
The South African public was invited to be the 7th judge, their vote counting for 25% of the overall score.

South Africans voted via text with the assistance of pageant sponsor Cell C.

During the Live telecast, the top six were announced in random order. The recipients were:

1. Odirile (Top 8)

2. Nicole (Top 8)

3. Shelbe (did not advance)

4. Adé (1st runner up)

5. Sháne Naidoo (Top 5)

6. Demi-Leigh (Winner)

Boipelo managed to secure 2nd-runner up, and Priyeshka made the Top 5 despite being snubbed by the South African public vote. Hot press favourite, Shelbe failed to make the first live cut.

Winner and runners-up

∞ Nel-Peters won Miss Universe 2017. Due to protocol, Nel-Peters resigned her title as Miss South Africa 2017, and the 1st Princess, Adè van Heerden, replaced her as Miss South Africa.

Contestants

References

External links

2017
2017 beauty pageants
2017 in South Africa
March 2017 events in South Africa